This article lists firm orders and deliveries for the Superjet 100, currently in production by the United Aircraft Corporation division Irkut (until November 2018 by the Sukhoi Company). 

It is impossible to confirm the accuracy of the Superjet order backlog as the manufacturer does not provide up to date order information, and there have been no updates on many longstanding orders.

Orders and deliveries

Overview

Timeline 

 Aug 2005 – Finance Leasing Company and Sukhoi Civil Aircraft sign a sales contract for 10 aircraft of the new RRJ family for $262 million at MAKS-2005.
 Dec 2005 – Aeroflot signs the contract for the delivery of 30 Sukhoi Superjet 100s, thus becoming the program's launch customer. The total deal is valued at approximately $820 million.
 19 Dec 2006 – Sukhoi Civil Aircraft wins a $170 million order from Dalavia Far East Airways.
 May 2007 – Aeroflot and Sukhoi Civil Aircraft Company announces the signature of the Letter of Intent to purchase 15 aircraft of Sukhoi Superjet 100 family. Earlier, Aeroflot had already signed the contract for delivery of 30 SSJ-100s. According to the letter, the airline will purchase 15 SSJ100/95s in basic configuration with deliveries to start in May 2011. The airline also holds an option for another five aircraft of the family. The deal amounts at over $400 million.
 Sep 2007 – Armavia signs a multimillion-dollar agreement to buy four SSJ-100-95LR Superjets for regional flights.
 Jul 2008 – Avia Leasing acquires 24 Sukhoi Superjet 100 aircraft in basic configuration with an option for 16 additional aircraft on the second day of the 2008 Farnborough Airshow. The order has a total value of over $630 million. Order firmed at Paris Airshow on 16 Jun 2009.
 Jul 2008 – SuperJet International announces an order by an undisclosed renowned European customer for a fleet of 20 new Sukhoi Superjet 100 aircraft valued at approximately $600 million.
 5 Dec 2008, Jakarta – Sukhoi Civil Aircraft Company and Kartika Airlines sign the Heads of Agreement for 15 Sukhoi Superjet 100s and another 15 optional aircraft. The order is valued at $448 million. Kartika Airlines is the first SSJ100 customer in Southeast Asia.
 17 Jun 2009, Paris Airshow – Gazprom orders 10 Superjet 100 aircraft.
 21 Aug 2009 – Yakutia Airlines orders 2 Superjet 100 aircraft.
 May 2010 – Laos-based newcomer Phongsavanh Airlines plans to launch services in 2012 and buy three Sukhoi RRJ95 SuperJet 100s.
 23 Jun 2010 – European Aviation Safety Agency certification for the Superjet Engine SaM146.
 19 Jul 2010 – Sukhoi Civil Aircraft and Indonesia's regional carrier Kartika Airlines sign $951 mln deal on 30 SSJ100s.
 20 Jul 2010 – Orient Thai Airlines to buy at least 12 Superjet 100s from Sukhoi.
 21 Jul 2010 – SuperJet International scores order for 30 Superjets, 15 options.
 1 Sep 2010 – Aeroflot announced that as part of its plan to order additional domestic aircraft it planned to purchase an additional 10 aircraft in addition to its 30 prior orders.
 2 Sep 2010 – SuperJet International signs agreement up to US$300 million.
 24 Nov 2010 – Thailand's Orient Thai Airlines announced the purchase of 12 Sukhoi Superjet-100/95Bs civilian aircraft.
 17 Jan 2011 – Mexico's third largest airline Interjet signed a $650 million deal for 15 Sukhoi Superjet-100 civilian aircraft, with an option to purchase five more. It is the North American launch customer and is the first and, so far, the only airline of the Americas to order a Sukhoi Superjet 100.
 3 Feb 2011 – Sukhoi Superjet 100 obtained IAC AR Type Certificate
 19 Apr 2011 – The first production aircraft was delivered to Armavia, celebrated with a ceremony in the Armenian capital Yerevan.
 21 Apr 2011 – The first commercial flight of Sukhoi SuperJet 100 with 90 passengers from Zvartnots International Airport, Yerevan, Armenia to Sheremetyevo International Airport, Moscow.
 16 Jun 2011 – Aeroflot Russian Airlines's Superjet 100 completed its first passenger flight operating from Sheremetyevo International Airport, Moscow, to Pulkovo International Airport, St. Petersburg.
 17 Jun 2011 – Aeroflot Russian Airlines's Superjet 100 completed its first schedule flight operating from Sheremetyevo International Airport, Moscow, to Nizhny Novgorod International Airport, Nizhny Novgorod.
 9 Oct 2011 – Comlux becomes the launching customer of SuperJet International for this new type of VIP aircraft
 19 Mar 2012 – All seven SuperJet planes in service grounded to have landing gear defect repaired. "Within a week the whole fleet will have repairs conducted," said a company spokesman, three days after an Aeroflot SuperJet made an unscheduled landing at Moscow's Sheremetyevo Airport.
 9 May 2012 – Crash during a demonstration flight in Indonesia, with 45 fatalities and no survivors.
 10 May 2012 – Pakistan's Air Indus allegedly showed an interest in buying 8 SSJ-100 planes.
 21 Jun 2012 – Transaero, Russia's number two carrier, signs a deal to buy up to 16 SSJ100 with delivery date starting 2015.
 18 Jun 2013 – Mexico's Interjet received its first Superjet 100 by Sukhoi at the Paris Air Show, another 19 Superjet 100s are due to be delivered in the coming months.
 26 Aug 2015 – Russian leasing company State Transport Leasing Co. (STLC) has signed a firm order for 32 Sukhoi Civil Aircraft Sukhoi Superjet 100 (SSJ100) aircraft at the MAKS (air show). The aircraft will be leased to Russian (Yamal Airlines 25 aircraft) and foreign operators.
 27 Aug 2015 – President Vladimir Putin announces at the MAKS air show, an international military exhibition held in the Russian city of Zhukovsky, with Egyptian President Abdel Fattah el-Sisi attending the exhibition, that it seeks to sell 12 Superjet 100 by Sukhoi to Egypt.
 3 Feb 2016 – Egypt's Air Leisure signed a letter of intent in buying 4 SSJ-100 aircraft with an option of 6 more.
 23 Jul 2017, MAKS (airshow) – 2017, Among MAKS’ biggest deals were a contract for the supplies of 20 Sukhoi Superjet 100 planes to Aeroflot.
 25–28 Apr 2018, Eurasia Airshow – Four orders of 92 SSJ-100 aircraft made in letters of intention made with S7, Iran Air Tours, Aseman Airlines, and Aero Mongolia.
 10 Sep 2018: Aeroflot reached an agreement for 100 Superjets in a two-class layout with 12 business seats and 75 in economy, to be delivered from 2019 to 2026.

Orders and current operators 
This is a list of sourced orders and current operators of the Superjet 100. However, as Sukhoi last updated its official order overview in 2012 and secondary sources are either outdated or contradicting, it is not possible to determine a fully complete and currently correct overview. As of November 2016, there were supposedly 146 aircraft delivered with 116 operating.

Letters of Intention signed and lessor/lessee agreements 
The following airlines and leasing companies signed letters of intent to order Superjet aircraft or lease them. Not included are contracts which are known to have been cancelled. Several of these entries might be no longer current as there is a lack of updates for several long-standing announcements.

Former operators and cancelled orders/agreements 
The following airlines and lessors either cancelled their orders/letters of intent for Superjet 100 aircraft or ended operating them for various reasons:

See also 

 Similar aircraft

 List of Airbus A220 orders and deliveries
 List of Boeing 737 MAX orders and deliveries
 List of Embraer E-Jet operators

Notes

References 

orders and deliveries
Lists of aircraft orders and deliveries